The 1938–39 Scottish Division Two was won by Cowdenbeath. Edinburgh City finished bottom. 

It was the last season of play until the 1946–47 season due to World War II; and it would be the final Scottish League season for King's Park and for St Bernard's, because of the difficulties they encountered during the war years.

Table

References

Scottish Football Archive

Scottish Division Two seasons
2
Scot